It has been said that Phyllis Schlafly's social policies are a response to feminism.

According to feminist Rosalind P. Petchesky, "The New Right", which includes Phyllis Schlafly and her political group the Eagle Forum, "must be understood as a response to feminist ideas and to their strong impact, in the 1970s, on popular consciousness". During the 1970s, while Schlafly worked against the Equal Rights Amendment and pro-ERA feminists, she formed a definitive stance on women's rights in direct opposition to feminist views of the time.

Development of anti-feminist policies 

Schlafly's social policies, especially those towards women, were largely formed during her crucial years as one of the main leaders of the anti-Equal Rights Amendment ("ERA") opposition front.  Schlafly's policies were in dispute with those of feminists like Betty Friedan; for instance, Schlafly argued that the ERA was "a direct threat to the protection that mothers and working women enjoyed in American society".

During the 20th century, including during her anti-ERA campaign, Schlafly was able to spread and implement her policies through her personal activities such as radio broadcasts, interviews on public television, circulation of her monthly newsletter, and 
organization and mobilization of churches and local communities. These activities "unleashed an intense and seemingly irrepressible culture war" during the volatile 70s and early 80s.  In these crucial years, the New Right implemented its policies as "opposition to...the Equal Rights Amendment...[was] used to galvanize a substantial segment of voters, funds, and resources on behalf of right-wing candidates and against candidates associated with liberalism and feminism".

Schlafly also relied on her Eagle Forum, the "alternative to women's lib", to implement her anti-ERA social policies.  While Schlafly was working against the ERA, both STOP ERA and the Eagle Forum were held together by "Schlafly's personal leadership plus their organ of communication, the Phyllis Schlafly Report, which each month presented news and new arguments against ERA, kept a running tally of votes by the states, and advised on campaign strategies and tactics".

Modern development and implementation of Schlafly's social policies 
Schlafly's influence didn't end with the ERA; the Eagle Forum continues to be a medium for the development and implementation of Schlafly's social policies, including her policies regarding women's rights.  In 2005, the Eagle Forum included "a membership of 50,000 women who [could] be mobilized for conservative causes and candidates". Schlafly's radio broadcasts and her monthly Phyllis Schlafly Report, which includes "essays on politics, education, national defense, feminism, the judiciary, and immigration", still operate (although since her death in 2016, the Phyllis Schlafly Report has been replaced by the Eagle Forum Report), and are important devices in Schlafly's attempted realization of her social policies. Her main focus continues to be "issues related to sexuality and the family...not only on a rhetorical level, but also on the level of mass organizing, intraparty and legislative struggles, and organizational alliances".

Schlafly's writings 
Schlafly has also nationally published several books detailing her anti-feminist stance and her social policies.  Those that particularly pertain to women's rights and Schlafly's social policies include the following:
The Flipside of Feminism, with Suzanne Venker (WND Books, 2011) 
Feminist Fantasies, foreword by Ann Coulter (Spence Publishing Company, 2003) 
Pornography's Victims (Crossway Books, 1987) 
Equal Pay for UNequal Work (Eagle Forum, 1984) 
The Power of the Christian Woman (Standard Pub, 1981) ISBN B0006E4X12
The Power of the Positive Woman (Crown Pub, 1977) 
Who Will Rock the Cradle? (W Pub Group, 1990) 

For a complete list of Schlafly's writings, see Eagle Forum.

Differences between men and women 
According to Schlafly's social policy writings, "men and women are different, and...those very differences provide the key to...success as a person and fulfillment as a woman". Schlafly's stance was a reaction to feminist proponents of the ERA, who argued that men and women should be treated equally in all circumstances, from employment to home living, and that they should be referred to using gender neutral terms. Schlafly, however, exalted the differences between men and women: "Feminine means accentuating the womanly attributes that make women deliciously different from men.  The feminine woman...knows that she is a person with her own identity and that she can seek fulfillment in the career of her choice, including of traditional wife and mother".
	
Schlafly held the position that men and women are fundamentally different, and resisted what she termed the "feminist [propagandist]" assertion that "we must redesign society to become gender neutral and that men must shed their macho image and remake themselves to become househusbands". Instead, she believed that nothing can eradicate the differences between men and women.  She says in The Power of the Positive Woman, "It is self-evident...that the female body with its baby-producing organs was not designed by a conspiracy of men but by the Divine Architect of the human race" Furthermore, "the Positive Woman looks upon her femaleness and her fertility as part of her purpose, her potential, and her power.  She rejoices that she has a capability for creativity that men can never have". Schlafly argued that although her feminist opponents seek to minimize the differences between men and women, "they will have to take up their complaint with God," because "no other power" can alter the fundamental and necessary differences between men and women.

Men's and women's roles in marriage 
In marriage, Schlafly argued, men and women's roles are different and should remain so, in spite of ERA-related feminist efforts to equalize their roles. In an article on the New Right, Rebecca Klatch explains Schlafly's view of marriage and the difference between men and women's roles: "Social conservative women believe in a strict division of gender roles as decreed by the scriptures.  Gender is envisioned as a hierarchal ordering with God and Christ at the top, followed by men, and then women". Schlafly defended her stance as one necessary to order instead of a threat to equality; she said, "If marriage is to be a successful institution, it must...have an ultimate decision maker, and that is the husband". Klatch further states that, according to Schlafly, "It is women's role to support men in their positions of higher authority through altruism and self-sacrifice".

Some feminists, like Petchesky, have criticized Schlafly's patriarchal stance, saying the New Right stands for male domination and female bondage, or "the right of the white male property owner to control his wife and his wife's body, his children and their bodies, his slaves and their bodies.  It is an ideology that is patriarchal and racist".

Motherhood 
Though a woman should be able to expand her talents and "join the competitive world" if she desires, her primary role, according to Schlafly, should be that of wife and mother, of homemaker rather than career woman.  Her stance is summarized by Susan E. Marshall in an article on anti-feminists, who states, "Females are uniquely suited for their domestic duties of home maintenance and child care, and conversely the domination of the public sphere by males is justified by their inherently superior aggressive, analytical, and logical abilities".

Schlafly also believed that motherhood is crucial to the well being of society; she states, "The career of motherhood is not recorded or compensated in cash wages in government statistics, but that doesn't make it any less valuable"; in fact, just the opposite is true: "[Motherhood] is the most socially useful role of all". Schlafly's view contrasts directly with what she claimed is the pro-ERA feminist perspective that caring for children and a husband is demeaning, and that women should not have to be directly responsible for their children if they desire to instead pursue a career. Instead, "the dependent wife and mother who cares for her own children...performs the most socially necessary role in our society.  The future of America depends on our next generation being morally, psychologically, intellectually, and physically strong".
	
Feminists have criticized Schlafly for this stance, claiming that her "'pro-life' and 'pro-family' ideology represent the urge to restore the values of motherhood as they haven't been propagated since the late eighteenth century". Schlafly, however, stood firm that woman's main role should be that of a mother, even in this modern century; she states, "Marriage and motherhood have their trials and tribulations, but what lifestyle doesn't?...The flight from home is a flight from self, from responsibility, from the nature of woman, in pursuit of false hopes and fading fantasies".

Family 
Schlafly acknowledged that motherhood and family life are difficult, but contends that the family is still the place of greatest growth and satisfaction for women. Schlafly rejected what she claimed is the feminist view that the family is an "anachronism" that binds women down. Instead, she said, "Faith, commitment, hard work, family, and children, and grandchildren still offer the most fulfillment, as well as our reach into the future.  Feminism is no substitute for traditional marriage...Careers are no substitute for children and grandchildren". The family doesn't destroy women's rights; rather, according to Schlafly, the institution of the family as "the basic unit of society...is the greatest single achievement in the entire history of women's rights".

Schlafly believed that the family supports society as its meets women's needs: "The strength and stability of families determines the vitality and moral life of society; thus, as the family goes, so goes the nation". The family, as well as standing "at the center of this world" and "representing the building block of society," also teaches children "moral values" that will benefit them and society as they grow to become moral citizens. Schlafly stated unequivocally that "the future of our nation depends on children who grow up to be good citizens, and the best way of achieving that goal is to have emotionally stable, intact families".

Schlafly rejected the 70s and 80s-era feminist "rejection of the family" as an outdated establishment, which she believed "flies in the face of all human experience"; instead, she believed that "the family is the proven best way for men and women to live together on this earth.  A family provides people who care about us, a nest and shelter from which we can face life's challenges".

Women and employment 
Schlafly believed that motherhood is the best job option for women seeking career fulfillment, and that "it is ludicrous to suggest that [other jobs] are more self-fulfilling than the daily duties of a wife and mother in the home". Though it can be necessary for some women to work outside the home, Schlafly stated that motherhood proffers the most satisfaction of any job, and "most women would rather cuddle a baby than a typewriter or factory machine.  Not only does the baby provide a warm and loving relationship that satisfies the woman's maternal instinct and returns love for service, but it is a creative and growing job that builds for the future".

Schlafly objected to what she saw as the feminist assertion that women are paid less than men or are otherwise discriminated against in the work force; she said, "a deceitful propaganda campaign has been orchestrated by the feminist movement to convince the American people that" women who take paying jobs receive fewer wages on the dollar than men who do the same work. This, she claimed, "is part of the feminists' denigration of the role of motherhood...[It] is designed to eliminate...motherhood by changing us into a society in which women are harnessed into the labor force both full-time and for a lifetime". In fact, Schlafly believed, even if men really do earn more than women, this is beneficial to society as a whole, because, "we want a society in which the average man earns more than the average woman so that his earnings can fulfill his provider role in providing a home and support for his wife who is nurturing and mothering their children".

Klatch theorizes, "Because social conservatives adhere to a hierarchal ordering, they believe positional difference between women and men do not imply inequality, and, therefore, they deny the existence of discrimination". Schlafly explained, "Just because there is a small percentage of women in senior management does not prove discrimination.  It proves instead that the majority of women have made other choices—usually family choices". Schlafly also objected to wage and other equality for women in the work force because they destroy mothers' protection from over-time work, which makes it "more difficult for women to perform their domestic duties". Similarly, Schlafly stated, "We certainly don't want a society in which the average wage paid to all women equals [that of] men, because that society would have eliminated the role of motherhood".

Quotations

Citations

References 

Criticism of feminism
Schlafly, Phyllis